Schinderbach is a small river of Rhineland-Palatinate and North Rhine-Westphalia, Germany. It flows into the Gosenbach near Siegen.

See also
List of rivers of Rhineland-Palatinate
List of rivers of North Rhine-Westphalia

Rivers of Rhineland-Palatinate
Rivers of North Rhine-Westphalia
Rivers of Germany